Maher Ridane is a Tunisian Olympic javelin thrower. He represented his country in the men's javelin throw at the 2000 Summer Olympics. His distance was a 70.35 in the qualifiers.

References

Living people
1971 births
Tunisian male javelin throwers
Olympic athletes of Tunisia
Athletes (track and field) at the 2000 Summer Olympics
African Games medalists in athletics (track and field)
African Games bronze medalists for Tunisia
Mediterranean Games bronze medalists for Tunisia
Mediterranean Games medalists in athletics
Athletes (track and field) at the 1999 All-Africa Games
Athletes (track and field) at the 1997 Mediterranean Games
21st-century Tunisian people
20th-century Tunisian people